The James Beard Foundation Awards are annual awards presented by the James Beard Foundation to recognize chefs, restaurateurs, authors and journalists in the United States. They are scheduled around James Beard's May 5 birthday. The media awards are presented at a dinner in New York City; the chef and restaurant awards were also presented in New York until 2015, when the foundation's annual gala moved to Chicago. Chicago will continue to host the Awards until 2027.

History 
The awards were established in 1990, when the foundation expanded its chef awards and combined them with Cook's Magazine's Who's Who of American Cooking and French's Food and Beverage Book Awards. In addition to the chef, restaurant, and book awards, journalism awards were added in 1993, which expanded to broadcast media in 1994, and restaurant design awards were first given in 1995.

In 2018, the James Beard Foundation changed the award's rules to be more inclusive, to fight race and gender imbalances in the industry. Changes include: judges reflecting the demographics of the U.S.; retiring the Who's Who of Food and Beverage in America awards which were judged by previous winners; adding leadership awards which focus on social justice issues; and waiving some media entry fees.

The awards are voted on by more than 600 culinary professionals, including previous award winners. Recipients receive a medallion etched with the image of James Beard and a certificate from the foundation.

Awards by decade:
 James Beard Foundation Award: 1990s
 James Beard Foundation Award: 2000s
 James Beard Foundation Award: 2010s
 James Beard Foundation Award: 2020s

America's Classics 

Although the awards tend to focus on upscale dining in large cities, since 1998 there has been an "America's Classics" category which honors legendary family-owned restaurants across the country. The "America's Classics" winners routinely draw the biggest applause of the night at the awards ceremony. To be considered for the award, restaurants must have been in business for a decade, be locally owned, show "timeless appeal," and serve "quality food that reflects the character of the community."

Who's Who of Food and Beverage in America 
The "Who's Who of Food and Beverage in America" was an award presented to members of the food and beverage industry who have been "identified by his or her peers as having displayed remarkable talent and achievement." The Who's Who awards were voted on by past honorees, with a ballot of 20 candidates distributed to the entire Who's Who group each year.

The honors were initially awarded by Cook's Magazine (the predecessor to Cook's Illustrated), which inaugurated the award in 1984 but ceased publication in 1990. The award was administered by the James Beard Foundation from 1990 to 2018 and presented at the annual gala. The foundation decided to retire the awards after 2018, citing a new commitment to inclusion. Including the inductees from the 1980s, the final Who's Who list included nearly 300 individuals.

The 1991 inductees were chef David Bouley; Ken Hom, journalist, teacher and expert on Chinese cooking; Bryan Miller, the restaurant critic of the New York Times; Michel Richard, chef-owner of Los Angeles' Citrus restaurant; and Nancy Silverton, owner of Campanile, Los Angeles.

The 1992 inductees were pastry chef Albert Kumin; authors, caterers and retailers Julee Rosso and Sheila Lukins; Drew Nieporent, owner of Montrachet and the Tribeca Grill in Manhattan; authors and columnists Jane and Michael Stern; and restaurant critic, journalist and author Patricia Wells.

The 1993 inductees were Ariane and Michael Batterberry (who founded Food & Wine and Food Arts magazines), Gael Greene (New York Magazine's restaurant critic), Robert M. Parker, Jr. (publisher of the Wine Advocate), Carl Sontheimer (creator of the food processor and Cuisinarts), Chuck Williams (founder of Williams-Sonoma), and Gregory Usher (director of l'Ecole de Gastronomie Francaise Ritz-Escoffier in Paris).

The 1994 inductees were Jean Anderson, Cecily Brownstone, Narcisse Chamberlain, Ariane Daguin and George Faison, Joel Dean and Giorgio DeLuca, Zack Hanle, Nancy Harmon Jenkins, Elizabeth Schneider, Jeff Smith, and Tim and Nina Zagat.

The 1995 inductees were Rick Bayless of Frontera Grill and Topolombampo, Joachim Splichal of Patina, Harold McGee, author of "On Food and Cooking," Daniel Boulud, Milton Glaser, Madhur Jaffrey, and Martha Stewart.

The 1996 inductees were Lidia Bastianich, Christopher Kimball, Zelma Long, Nick Malgieri, Danny Meyer, Jean-Jacques Rachou, and Charlie Trotter.

The 1997 inductees were cookbook author Flo Braker, culinary historian Barbara Haber, television personality Graham Kerr, winemakers Michael and Timothy Mondavi (sons of Robert Mondavi), restaurateurs Julian Niccolini and Alex von Bidder (new owners of New York's the Four Seasons) and restaurant designer Adam Tihany.

The 1998 inductees were Paula Lambert, founder and president, the Mozzarella Co., Dallas; Carolyn O'Neil, executive producer and correspondent, CNN's "On the Menu," Atlanta; Charles Palmer, chef and restaurateur, New York City; Alan Richman, writer, GQ magazine, New York City; and Jean-Georges Vongerichten, chef and restaurateur, New York City.

The 1999 inductees were R. W. Apple Jr. of the New York Times, winemaker Ernest Gallo, author and columnist Molly O'Neill, Bill Shore of Share Our Strength, and Gail Zweigenthal of Gourmet (magazine).

The 2000 inductees were Barbara Fairchild, editor, Bon Appetit magazine; Thomas Keller, chef, French Laundry (Oakville, Calif.); Michael Romano, chef, Union Square Cafe (New York City); Jeffrey Steingarten, columnist, Vogue magazine; Larry Stone, wine director, Rubicon (San Francisco).

The 2001 inductees were Mario Batali, chef/co-owner, Babbo and Esca, New York; Michael Ginor and Izzy Yanay, founders, Hudson Valley Foie Gras, Great Neck, N.Y.; Lynne Rossetto Kasper, host of "The Splendid Table with Lynne Rossetto Kasper," St. Paul, Minn.; Joan Nathan, cookbook author, Washington, D.C.; and Martin Yan, cooking show host, Foster City, Calif.

The 2002 inductees were Tom Colicchio, Alain Ducasse, Nobu Matsuhisa, Sara Moulton and Frank J. Prial.

The 2003 inductees were Hubert Keller, Marion Nestle, Alain Sailhac, Jacques Torres and Norman Van Aken.

The 2004 inductees were Michael Bauer, Rose Levy Beranbaum, Todd English, Andrea Immer and Eric Ripert.

The 2005 inductees were Joseph Bastianich (co-owner of Italian Wine Merchants and Babbo, Becco, Lupa, Esca, Otto Enoteca Pizzeria and Bistro du Vent restaurants, New York City); Greg Drescher (Senior Director for Strategic Initiatives, The Culinary Institute of America, Greystone, St. Helena, CA); Carol Field (book author and food writer, San Francisco, CA); Corby Kummer (Senior Editor, The Atlantic Monthly, Boston, MA); and, Deborah Madison (chef, cookbook author and journalist, Galisteo, NM).

The 2006 inductees were Sue Conley and Peggy Smith, Co-Founders of Cowgirl Creamery (Point Reyes Station, CA); Jean Joho, Chef and Proprietor of Everest, Chicago; Gray Kunz, Founding Chef of Café Gray, NYC; Kermit Lynch, Founder and Owner of Kermit Lynch Wine Merchant (Berkeley, CA); and Ari Weinzweig, Co-Founder of Zingerman's Deli (Ann Arbor, MI).

The 2007 inductees were José Andrés, Jim Clendenen, Bobby Flay, Dorie Greenspan, and Michael Pollan.

The 2008 inductees were Dan Barber, Anthony Bourdain, Nancy Oakes, Russ Parsons, Zanne Early Stewart, and Steve Sullivan.

The 2009 inductees were David Burke, John T. Edge, Betty Fussell, Dorothy Cann Hamilton, and Clark Wolf.

The 2010 inductees were Leah Chase, Chef/Owner, Dooky Chase Restaurant, New Orleans, Louisiana; Jessica B. Harris, Author and Historian, New York, New York; Paul C. P. McIlhenny, President and CEO, McIlhenny Company, Avery Island, Louisiana; David Rockwell, Founder and CEO, Rockwell Group, New York, New York; L. Timothy Ryan, President, Culinary Institute of America, Hyde Park, New York; and Susan Spicer, Chef/Owner, Bayona, New Orleans, Louisiana.

The 2011 inductees were Jonathan Gold of the LA Weekly, Lee Jones of Chef's Garden (Huron, OH), Charles Phan of the Slanted Door (San Francisco, CA), Frank Stitt of Highlands Bar and Grill, and Nick Valenti of the Patina Restaurant Group (New York, NY).

The 2012 inductees were Grant Achatz, Chef and Author; Mark Bittman, Journalist and Author; Dana Cowin, Editor-in-Chief, Food & Wine; Emily Luchetti, Pastry Chef and Author; and Marvin Shanken, Publisher, Food Arts and Wine Spectator.

The 2013 inductees were Eric Asimov, Author and Journalist; Dorothy Kalins, Editor; Barbara Lynch, Chef and Restaurateur; Zarela Martinez, Chef and Restaurateur; Michael Mina, Chef and Restaurateur; and Bill Yosses, Author and Pastry Chef.

The 2014 inductees were Edward Behr, Food Writer; John Besh, Chef and Restaurateur; David Chang, Chef and Restaurateur; Barry Estabrook, Writer; Paul Kahan, Chef and Restaurateur; Sherry Yard, Pastry Chef and Author.

The 2015 inductees were Allan Benton, Pork Producer and Purveyor;Dale DeGroff, Mixologist; Wylie Dufresne, Chef and Restaurateur;Nathalie Dupree, Cookbook Author and Television Personality; and Maricel Presilla, Chef, Restaurateur, and Cookbook Author.

The 2016 inductees were Gina Gallo, Winemaker (Sonoma, CA); Jim Lahey, Baker and Proprietor NYC; Ed Levine, Author and Founder of Serious Eats (NYC); Temple Grandin, Author and Animal Rights Activist (Fort Collins, CO); and Marcus Samuelsson, Chef and Restaurateur (NYC).

The 2017 inductees were Suzanne Goin, Chef and Restaurateur (Los Angeles, CA);
Evan Kleiman, Culinarian (Los Angeles, CA); Roger Berkowitz, President and CEO Legal Seafoods (Boston, MA); Michel Nischan, Chef, Founder, President, and CEO of Wholesome Wave (Bridgeport, CT); and Rajat Parr, Winemaker and Sommelier, Domaine de la Cote (Lompoc, CA).

The 2018 inductees were Jody Adams, Chef/Owner, TRADE, Porto, and Saloniki (Boston, MA); Lally Brennan and Ti Adelaide Martin, Co-Proprietors, Commander's Palace (New Orleans, LA); Allison Hooper, Co-Founder, Vermont Creamery (Websterville, VT); and Daniel Johnnes, Wine Director, The Dinex Group (New York City, NY).

References

External links 
 JBF Awards from the James Beard Foundation website
 James Beard Awards website

Awards established in 1990
Food and drink awards
James Beard Foundation Award winners
Food and drink literary awards